James Gilbert George Hetherington (born , Brighton) is a former England rugby union player. He played 6 matches for the England national rugby union team between 1958 and 1959.

Hetherington, a talented fullback made his international debut on 1 February 1958, against Australia at Twickenham. His final cap came on 21 March 1959, against Scotland, also at Twickenham. All 6 of Hetherington's caps were starts, with 5 coming in the Six Nations Championship (then called the Five Nations). He scored a total of 9 international points.

He attended Churcher's College, in Petersfield, Hampshire.

References

1932 births
Living people
English rugby union players
People educated at Churcher's College
England international rugby union players
English people of Scottish descent
Rugby union players from Brighton
Rugby union fullbacks